Bryan James "Chas" Chandler (18 December 1938 – 17 July 1996) was an English musician, record producer and manager, best known as the original bassist in The Animals, for which he was inducted into the Rock and Roll Hall of Fame in 1994. He also managed the band Slade, and Jimi Hendrix, about whom he was regularly interviewed until his death in 1996.

Early life
Chandler was born in Heaton, Newcastle. After leaving school, he worked as a turner in the Tyneside shipyards. He became the bass player with The Alan Price Trio in 1962.

Career

The Animals
After Eric Burdon joined the band, the Alan Price Trio was renamed The Animals. Chandler's bass lines were rarely given critical attention but some, including the opening riff of the group's 1965 hit "We Gotta Get Out of This Place" subsequently received praise. Chandler was also the most prominent of the group's backing vocalists and did occasional songwriting with Burdon. In 1966, despite commercial success, Chandler became disillusioned with the lack of money, recalling that, "We toured non-stop for three years, doing 300 gigs a year and we hardly got a penny."

Jimi Hendrix and Slade
After The Animals underwent personnel changes in 1966, Chandler turned to becoming a talent scout, artist manager, and record producer. During his final tour with The Animals, Chandler saw a then-unknown Jimi Hendrix play in Cafe Wha?, a Greenwich Village, New York City nightclub. At the time Hendrix was performing under the name Jimmy James. In September, Chandler convinced Hendrix to accompany him to Britain, which was made possible with the help of Michael Jeffery, who suggested that he revert to his actual name, and later suggested naming the band the Jimi Hendrix Experience. In Britain, Chandler recruited bassist Noel Redding and drummer Mitch Mitchell as the other members of the Experience. His enthusiasm fuelled Hendrix during the early days, but halfway through the recording of his third album in 1968, Electric Ladyland, much had changed within the band's framework.

Chandler was a key figure in Hendrix's rise to critical and commercial success. Chandler provided the young musician with living accommodations and financed the Experience's first single "Hey Joe", before they had a recording contract. He was also instrumental in introducing Hendrix to Eric Clapton. It was through this introduction that Hendrix was given the opportunity to play with Clapton and Cream on stage. It was Chandler's idea for Hendrix to set his guitar on fire, which made national news when this idea was used at a concert at the Finsbury Park Astoria Theatre and subsequently at the Monterey Pop festival. Hendrix's sound engineer Eddie Kramer later recalled that Chandler was very hands-on with the first two Hendrix albums, adding that "he was his mentor and I think it was very necessary."

By 1968, Chandler had become frustrated with the recording sessions for Hendrix's album Electric Ladyland, claiming they were self-indulgent. He left management services in the hands of Jeffery during the following year. Chandler then managed and produced the British rock band Slade for 12 years, during which they achieved six number one chart hits in the UK. Chandler and Slade parted company following the failure of the "Knuckle Sandwich Nancy" single in May 1981. He would, however negotiate their RCA contract which lasted for four new albums.

Expansion of music industry interests
Chandler bought IBC Studios which he renamed Portland Recording Studios, after the studio address of 35 Portland Place, London and ran it for four years until he sold it to Don Arden. Chandler also ran a series of record labels from the studios including Barn Records, Six of the Best and Cheapskate Records. He formed a music publishing agency, as well as a production company and management companies. He also had a brief stint in which he produced the Philadelphia-based rock group Horsepower, founded by Michael James Kennedy in 1978.

The Animals reunions
In 1977, Chandler played and recorded with The Animals during a brief reunion and he joined them again for a further revival in 1983, at which point he sold his business interests, in order to concentrate on being a musician. During the early 1990s, he helped finance the development of Newcastle Arena, a 10,000 seat sports and entertainment venue which opened in 1995.

Personal life and death
Chandler died of an aortic aneurysm at Newcastle General Hospital on 17 July 1996, days after performing a solo show. Chandler's former home at 35 Second Avenue, Heaton, hosts a blue plaque placed on the wall by Newcastle City Council, which reads: "Chas Chandler 1938–1996. Founder member of the 'Animals'. Manager of Jimi Hendrix & Slade. Co-founder of Newcastle Arena. Lived in this house 1938–1964."

References

Bibliography

External links

Chas Chandler obituary

1938 births
1996 deaths
20th-century English musicians
English blues guitarists
British rhythm and blues boom musicians
English music managers
English rock bass guitarists
Male bass guitarists
English rock guitarists
English record producers
Musicians from Newcastle upon Tyne
The Animals members
20th-century English bass guitarists
Deaths from aortic aneurysm
20th-century English businesspeople
20th-century British male musicians